Live In London Town is the first live DVD by William Control.  It was filmed at several venues in London in August/September 2012.  The main feature is from the first show, at the Islington Academy on August 29, where Control’s first album, Hate Culture, was played in its entirety.  Extra footage was filmed over the following 2 shows at the Camden Barfly (August 31) and the Islington Metalworks (September 1). 
 
A teaser trailer was published on YouTube on October 21, 2012. The DVD itself featured a brand new song called Speak To Me Of Abduction, which played over the closing credits.  An unnamed female contributed vocals to the track.  A video for this was published on YouTube on December 31, 2012.

Only 500 physical DVDs were made.  The audio is available for download from various sources, and Control uploaded the entire film to YouTube on December 1, 2016.

Track listing

Personnel 
 William Control: vocals, mixing 
 Kenneth Fletcher: guitar, backing vocals 
 Nicholas Wiggins: bass, backing vocals 
 
 Live sound: Chris Surgenor 
 Film producer: Tim Bullock, A Glass Half Productions 
 Cover photo: Katie Imogen 
 Live photos: Lisa Johnson 
 Design: Live Evil Designs

References 
 

 
2013 video albums 
Control Records albums 
Live synth-pop albums 
Dark wave albums 
2013 live albums